The 2012 Wigan Council elections to the Thirtieth Wigan Council were held on 3 May 2012, the same day as other local elections.  One-third of the council was up for election.

As Wigan Council is elected in thirds, change in vote share is compared with the corresponding 2008 elections and calculated on that basis.

Overview

Results

Bolton West constituency

Atherton ward

Makerfield constituency

Abram ward

Ashton ward

Bryn ward

Hindley ward

Hindley Green ward

Orrell ward

Winstanley ward

Worsley Mesnes ward

Leigh constituency

Astley Mosley Common ward

Atherleigh ward

Golborne and Lowton West ward

Leigh East ward

Leigh South ward

Leigh West ward

Lowton East ward

Tyldesley ward

Wigan constituency

Aspull, New Springs and Whelley ward

Douglas ward

Ince ward

Pemberton ward

Shevington with Lower Ground ward

Standish with Langtree ward

Wigan Central ward

Wigan West ward

References

2012 English local elections
2012
2010s in Greater Manchester